Ogbonna Nwuke (born 16 September 1959) is a Nigerian politician, newspaper publisher and owner of the Port Harcourt Telegraph. He has served in both non-elected and elected public offices, including Director of Press Affairs to Governor Chibuike Amaechi, Commissioner of Information and Communications (2008–2009) as well as Commerce and Industry (2009–2010) and Member of the House of Representatives for Etche–Omuma constituency (2011–2015).

Early life
Ogbonna Nwuke was born on 16 September 1959 to the Nwuke family in Omuma local government area, Rivers State. His father J.H.E. was Parliamentary Secretary of Internal Affairs under the Nnamdi Azikiwe administration in Eastern Nigeria, later Provincial Commissioner of Port Harcourt Province and Minister of State for Works under the M.I. Okpara administration.

Political career
Nwuke was elected to the House of Representatives of Nigeria in 2011. He represented the federal constituency Etche-Omuma until 2015.

See also
List of people from Rivers State

References

1959 births
Living people
People from Omuma
Commissioners of ministries of Rivers State
Journalists from Rivers State
Information ministers
Office of the Governor of Rivers State
Members of the House of Representatives (Nigeria) from Rivers State